John Crane Neilson (2 August 1921 – 24 March 1988) was a Scottish professional footballer. He was a centre forward.

Neilson played for Clyde, Bradford City, where he was the club's top goal-scorer in 1947–48 before he left after just five games the following season, and Wrexham.

References

External links

1921 births
1988 deaths
Association football inside forwards
Scottish footballers
Scottish Football League players
English Football League players
Arbroath F.C. players
Aberdeen F.C. players
Clyde F.C. players
Bradford City A.F.C. players
Wrexham A.F.C. players
Queen of the South F.C. players
Footballers from Hamilton, South Lanarkshire
Ballymena United F.C. players
Crusaders F.C. players
Date of death missing
Stonehouse Violet F.C. players
Scottish Junior Football Association players